James or Jim Jenkins may refer to:

Sports
 Jim Jenkins (footballer) (1897–1983), Australian rules footballer
 James Lindley Jenkins (born 1954), English footballer
 James Jenkins (American football) (born 1967), American football player
 Pee Wee Jenkins (James Edward Jenkins, 1923–2002), American baseball player

Others
 James Jenkins (Cornish scholar) (died 1710)
 James Jenkins (Methodist) (1764–1847), circuit rider
 James Graham Jenkins (1834–1921), U.S. federal judge
 James J. Jenkins (1923–2012), American psychologist
 James Allister Jenkins, Canadian–American mathematician
 Christopher Jenkins (lawyer) (James Christopher Jenkins, born 1939), British lawyer

See also
 Jim Jinkins (born 1953), American animator, creator of the television series PB&J Otter and Doug